Kelsie Whitmore (born July 5, 1998) is an American professional baseball pitcher and outfielder for the Staten Island FerryHawks of the Atlantic League of Professional Baseball. She was the first woman to appear in the starting lineup in an Atlantic League game. She was a member of the United States women's national baseball team from 2014 to 2019. Whitmore played college softball for the Cal State Fullerton Titans and has also played professionally for the Sonoma Stompers of the Pacific Association.

Career
As a youth, Whitmore played Little League Baseball and PONY Baseball. She attended Temecula Valley High School in Temecula, California. She played for the school's baseball team, and was the only female on the team. She also played soccer and golf at Temecula Valley. Whitmore enrolled at California State University, Fullerton, where she received a scholarship to play college softball for the Cal State Fullerton Titans. She was also allowed to train with the Cal State Fullerton Titans baseball team. Whitmore received a fifth year of eligibility from the National Collegiate Athletic Association due to the cancellation of the 2020 season because of the COVID-19 pandemic. In the 2021 season, she batted .395 with a .507 on-base percentage and a .824 slugging percentage. She was named the Big West Conference's softball player of the year.

While she attended high school, Whitmore joined the United States women's national baseball team. She won the silver medal at the 2014 Women's Baseball World Cup and the gold medal in the 2015 Pan American Games. Whitmore also participated in the 2018 Women's Baseball World Cup, as the United States finished in fourth place. Playing for the national team from 2014 through 2019, she had a 1.35 earned run average as a pitcher.

In 2016, the Sonoma Stompers of the Pacific Association, an independent baseball league, signed Whitmore and Stacy Piagno; they became the first female teammates in professional baseball since the 1950s when women played in the Negro Leagues. She recorded her first professional hit on July 20. She also played for Sonoma in the 2017 season. Whitmore had two hits in 26 at bats. She also pitched three innings for Sonoma. Whitmore pitched to Anna Kimbrell during a game in 2016, forming the first all-female battery in a professional baseball league game since the All-American Girls Professional Baseball League.

In October 2021, Whitmore joined the Portland Pickles of the West Coast League, a collegiate summer baseball league, when they played a two-game series against the Venados de Mazatlán of the Mexican Pacific League. In the second game, Whitmore pitched five innings without allowing a run.

On April 8, 2022, Whitmore signed with the Staten Island FerryHawks of the Atlantic League of Professional Baseball. She debuted in the Atlantic League as a pinch runner on April 22 and became the first woman to start an Atlantic League game on May 1, playing as a left fielder. On May 4, Whitmore became the first woman to pitch in an Atlantic League game when she made her first pitching appearance for Staten Island; entering the game with the bases loaded and two outs, she retired Ryan Jackson, a former major leaguer, on a fly out to end the inning. For the 2022 season, Whitmore batted .026 (a single in 39 at-bats), while on the mound allowed 14 earned runs in 10 1/3 innings for a 12.19 ERA.

See also
Women in baseball

References

External links 

 Kelsie Whitmore on Team USA
 New York Times June 2022 profile article

American female baseball players
Baseball catchers
1998 births
Living people
Baseball players at the 2015 Pan American Games
Sonoma Stompers players
Pan American Games medalists in baseball
Pan American Games gold medalists for the United States
Medalists at the 2015 Pan American Games
21st-century American women
Staten Island FerryHawks players
Cal State Fullerton Titans softball players
Baseball players from San Diego